Desmond Gareth Julian (24 April 1926 – 26 December 2019) was a British cardiologist who pioneered the creation of coronary care units.

Life
He was professor of cardiology at Newcastle University (1975–86), medical director of the British Heart Foundation (1986–93) and president of the British Cardiovascular Society (1985–87).

Awards
Julian received the European Society of Cardiology's gold medal.

References 

1926 births
2019 deaths
British cardiologists
Academics of Newcastle University